The National Library of Zimbabwe is located in Bulawayo second biggest city in Zimbabwe. It was established under the National Library and Documentation Service (NLDS) Act Chapter 25:10 act of 1985 which was passed by the Zimbabwean Government in 1985. The main purpose of the library is to provide book lending service, inter-library loans and act as a National Public Library in Zimbabwe.

The library used to be managed by 30 librarians but due to lack of support it is now staffed by 5 workers.

See also 
 National Archives of Zimbabwe
 List of national libraries

References

Bibliography
 . (Includes information about the national library)

Zimbabwe
Buildings and structures in Bulawayo
Libraries in Zimbabwe